Peter Loeffler is an American singer, songwriter, and musician. He is the lead vocalist, guitarist, and songwriter of the rock band Chevelle alongside his brother, drummer Sam Loeffler.

Pete, Sam, and bassist Joe Loeffler formed Chevelle in 1995. Joe left the band in 2004, later being replaced with their brother-in-law Dean Bernardini.

As of February 2023, Chevelle have released nine studio albums.

Early life 
Loeffler started off in music when he started taking piano lessons in his family when he was seven years old.

Career 
Pete and his two brothers formed Chevelle in 1995. The band's name came from the band members' passion for fast cars. It was also a car their father liked, the Chevrolet Chevelle. They released their first album, Point #1, in 1999. On October 8, 2012, while performing a show in Tucson, Arizona, Loeffler fell off the stage and injured his knee and caused swelling. The show continued after a brief intermission and Pete later went to the hospital where it was revealed that he did not break any bones. They later signed a 20-year contract with Epic Records. Since then, they have released nine studio albums under Epic. In a March 17, 2021, interview with Loudwire, Loeffler stated that despite the band selling over six million albums, they haven't gotten any money out of it. The money all went back to Epic. He blames it on signing a bad contract early on in his career. Their tenth album, which is expected to release in 2023, will not be under the record label.

Equipment
From the start of his career to mid-2014, Loeffler used PRS, two of which were custom-built for him.  He also uses two PRS Custom 22s, one red (which can be seen in the music video for "Send The Pain Below") and one white custom 24 (his main live guitar) and 2 Custom 24 baritones (one of which is a baritone with red "X's" on the neck as inlays, the other is gold-top). Pete also owns Fender Stratocaster Sub-Sonic Baritones (two were stolen along with the rest of the band's gear on May 9, 2007). In earlier live sets (prior to the band's EP) Pete had played a blue Ibanez RG among other guitars. Pete also reportedly used a Gibson Les Paul for some parts on the 2011 album Hats Off to the Bull. As of recently, Loeffler has switched and favoured Fender guitars, taking on the road one of his Sub-sonic Stratocasters, as well as a modified Jim Root Stratocaster.

As of 2014, his pedalboard currently consists of these effect pedals:
 Boss GE-7 Equalizer
 Boss TR-2 Tremolo
 Dunlop Cry Baby Wah
 Electro-Harmonix Holy Grail Reverb
 G-Lab True Bypass Wah Pad
 MXR Phase 90
 Peterson StroboStomp 2 Tuner
 Tech 21 SansAmp GT2
 Voodoo Lab Pedal Power 2 Plus

Style
Pete Loeffler's vocal style has been compared to Tool's Maynard James Keenan. In an interview with Ultimate Guitar about their fourth studio album, Vena Sera, Loeffler talked about his vocal style:

The band's ninth studio album, NIRATIAS, balanced the band's melodic and aggressive style. Loeffler compared it to the band's more melodic albums like Hats Off to the Bull and Wonder What's Next, as opposed to the heavier sound of The North Corridor.

Discography 

Studio albums
 Point #1 (1999)
 Wonder What's Next (2002)
 This Type of Thinking (Could Do Us In) (2004)
 Vena Sera (2007)
 Sci-Fi Crimes (2009)
 Hats Off to the Bull (2011)
 La Gárgola (2014)
  The North Corridor (2016)
  NIRATIAS (2021)

References 

Living people
Musicians from Illinois
People from Grayslake, Illinois
Year of birth missing (living people)